King Hing, previously Tai Hing South, is one of the 31 constituencies in the Tuen Mun District.

Created for the 1994 District Board elections, the constituency returns one district councillor to the Tuen Mun District Council, with an election every four years.

King Hing loosely covers areas surrounding part of Shan King Estate and part of Tai Hang Estate in Tuen Mun with an estimated population of 14,921.

Councillors represented

Election results

2010s

References

Tuen Mun
Constituencies of Hong Kong
Constituencies of Tuen Mun District Council
1994 establishments in Hong Kong
Constituencies established in 1994